Yurii Alekseevich Mitropolskiy (3 January 1917 – 14 June 2008) was a renowned Soviet and Ukrainian mathematician known for his contributions to the fields of dynamical systems and nonlinear oscillations. He was born in Poltava Governorate and died in Kyiv.

He received his Ph.D. from Kyiv University, under the supervision of theoretical physicist and mathematician Nikolay Bogolyubov. Mitropolskiy is one of the most frequently joint-published mathematicians known, with at least 240 collaborators. Mitropolskiy was a member of Communist Party of USSR since 1945.

Eponym
Krylov–Bogoliubov–Mitropolskiy asymptotic method

Selected works
N. N. Bogoliubov and Y. A. Mitropolski. Asymptotic methods in the theory of non-linear oscillations. New York: Gordon and Breach, 1961 (translated from Russian).
N. N. Bogoljubov, Ju. A. Mitropoliskii, and A. M. Samoilenko. Methods of accelerated convergence in nonlinear mechanics. New York: Springer-Verlag, 1976 (translated from Russian).
Yu. A. Mitropolaky and A. K. Lopatin. Nonlinear mechanics, groups and symmetry. Dordrecht; Boston: Kluwer Academic Publishers, 1995. .
Yu. A. Mitropolʹskii. Problems of the asymptotic theory of nonstationary vibrations. Jerusalem: Israel Program for Scientific Translations, 1965.
Yu. A. Mitropolsky, A. M. Samoilenko, and D. I. Martinyuk. Systems of evolution equations with periodic and quasiperiodic coefficients. Dordrecht; Boston: Kluwer Academic, 1993. .
Integrable dynamical systems (coauthor).

References

1917 births
2008 deaths
Burials at Baikove Cemetery
People from Poltava Oblast
People from Mirgorodsky Uyezd
Mathematical physicists
20th-century Ukrainian mathematicians
Soviet mathematicians
NASU Institute of Mathematics
Members of the National Academy of Sciences of Ukraine
Members of the Shevchenko Scientific Society
Full Members of the USSR Academy of Sciences
Full Members of the Russian Academy of Sciences
Recipients of the title of Hero of Ukraine
Recipients of the Order of State
Recipients of the Order of Prince Yaroslav the Wise, 4th class
Recipients of the Order of Prince Yaroslav the Wise, 5th class
Laureates of the State Prize of Ukraine in Science and Technology